Ward Louis "Piggy" Lambert (May 28, 1888 – January 20, 1958) was an American basketball and baseball coach.  He served as the head basketball coach at Purdue University during the 1916–17 season and from 1918 to 1946.  Lambert was also the head baseball coach at Purdue in 1917, from 1919 to 1935, and from 1945 to 1946.  He was inducted into the Naismith Memorial Basketball Hall of Fame in 1960.

Early life and playing career
Lambert was born in Deadwood, South Dakota. In 1890, Lambert and his family moved to Crawfordsville, Indiana. He played basketball and baseball at Crawfordsville High School and Wabash College, both under coach Ralph Jones, who himself went on to coach Purdue in 1909. Football coach Jesse Harper took over as Lambert's basketball coach in 1910 following the departure of Ralph Jones. Despite his height (5'6"), Lambert led Wabash in scoring his sophomore year—leading to his nickname "Piggy" for hogging the ball. Another telling states that, while playing baseball at Wabash, Lambert used his position as shortstop to hog the ball. He graduated from Wabash College in 1911.

Coaching career
Lambert began his coaching career at Lebanon High School from 1912 to 1916, amassing a record of 69–18 (.793) a Sectional title and 3 other post-season appearances; including a berth in the State Semi-Finals in 1913-14. Lambert coached Purdue University (1916–17, 1918–1946) to a 371–152 record in 29 seasons, including 11 Big Ten Conference titles. His teams were noted for their speed and effective use of fast breaks, which he developed. Among his players were Stretch Murphy and John Wooden. Lambert missed the 1917–18 season to serve in the United States Army during World War I. Meanwhile, J. J. Maloney, an attorney from Crawfordsville, Indiana, filled in and guided the Boilermakers to an 11–5 record. Lambert's 1931–32 team finished the season with a 17–1 record and was retroactively named the national champion by the Helms Athletic Foundation and the Premo-Porretta Power Poll. He coached 16 All-Americans and 31 first team All-Big Ten selections. Lambert Fieldhouse (originally known as Purdue Fieldhouse), the facility used for home basketball games prior to the construction of Mackey Arena, was renamed in his honor.

Lambert is now third on Purdue's all-time wins list behind Gene Keady and current head coach Matt Painter.

Lambert also coached Purdue's baseball team in 1917, from 1919 to 1935, and from 1945 to 1946.  Lambert Field, Purdue's former baseball stadium, is also named for Lambert.  He was listed as a scout for the New York Yankees of Major League Baseball in 1948.

Administrative career, writing, and honors
Following his retirement from Purdue, he served as Commissioner of the National Basketball League during the final three years (1946–1949) of that league's tenure and was instrumental in its merger with the Basketball Association of America to form the National Basketball Association.

Lambert wrote Practical Basketball in 1932, one of the first "bibles" of the game. He was inducted into the Naismith Memorial Basketball Hall of Fame in 1960 and the National Collegiate Basketball Hall of Fame in 2006.

References

External links
 

1888 births
1958 deaths
American men's basketball coaches
American men's basketball players
United States Army personnel of World War I
American sports executives and administrators
Baseball players from Indiana
Baseball shortstops
Basketball coaches from Indiana
Basketball executives
Basketball players from Indiana
College men's basketball head coaches in the United States
Crawfordsville High School alumni
High school basketball coaches in the United States
Naismith Memorial Basketball Hall of Fame inductees
National Collegiate Basketball Hall of Fame inductees
New York Yankees scouts
People from Deadwood, South Dakota
Players of American football from Indiana
Point guards
Purdue Boilermakers baseball coaches
Purdue Boilermakers men's basketball coaches
Sports commissioners
United States Army officers
Wabash Little Giants baseball players
Wabash Little Giants basketball players
Wabash Little Giants football players